League1 Alberta (L1AB) is a proposed semi-professional men's and women's soccer league in Alberta, Canada, to be sanctioned by the Canadian Soccer Association and the Alberta Soccer Association as a tier 3 league in the Canadian soccer league system.

Belonging to the League1 Canada organization, the men's division will fall below the Canadian Premier League (CPL), and both divisions will be equivalent to current pro-am leagues in British Columbia, Ontario, and Quebec. The league will begin in 2023 as an exhibition series, and plans to fully launch in 2024.

History
In 2021, a group of clubs from British Columbia, Alberta, and Manitoba organized the 2021 Summer Series, a series of friendly soccer matches played between Western Canadian soccer clubs to showcase a potential national second division. In 2022, another exhibition showcase was organized by four clubs – three from Alberta  (Calgary Foothills FC, Edmonton Scottish, BTB Soccer Academy) and one from Manitoba (FC Manitoba) – as an entity known as Central League1.

In March 2023, League1 Alberta was announced with an exhibition series being organized for the summer of 2023, with six clubs participating (five in each gendered division) – the Calgary Foothills, Edmonton Scottish, St. Albert Impact, and BTB Soccer Academy would field teams of both genders, while Cavalry FC would field a team in the men's series and the Calgary Blizzard in the women's division. An official league season is planned to be launched for the 2024 season.

Teams
Currently five men's teams and five women's teams have been announced to participate in the exhibition series, of which three are based in Greater Calgary and three are based in Greater Edmonton.

See also

 2021 Summer Series
 Canadian soccer league system
 League1 British Columbia
 League1 Ontario
 Première ligue de soccer du Québec
 USL League Two

References

Soccer leagues in Canada
Can
League1 Canada
2023 establishments in Alberta